Tranquil Gervacio S. Salvador III (born May 19, 1967) is a Filipino lawyer, educator, civic leader, and media advocate for mainstreaming and popularizing law education in the Philippines. He has served as spokesperson and member of the defense panel for the impeachment of the then-Chief Justice Renato Corona and handled other notable cases of Filipino personalities and corporations.

He is a well-cited legal analyst for issues of national interest including the removal from office of former Chief Justice Maria Lourdes Sereno and the impeachment complaint filed against the seven justices who voted to remove Sereno through a quo warranto petition.

Salvador III is the host for television and radio legal education programs, Patakaran of Net 25 and Legally Yours of Radyo Agila. He writes the column "Footnotes" in Manila Standard  He also holds professorial and teaching positions in leading universities and law centers in the Philippines.

Concurrently, he is a Partner in the Romulo Mabanta, Buenaventura, Sayoc, and De Los Angeles Law Firm, where he co-heads the Litigation & Arbitration, and Environment and Natural Resources Departments.

Early life and education 
Salvador III, born on May 19, 1967, is the eldest of the three children born to Tranquil Phodaca Salvador Jr., a retired Makati regional trial court judge, and Cornelia Suaverdez. His grandparents, Tranquilino Salvador, Sr. and Naomi Phodaca, were both lawyers of long standing and admitted to the practice of law before World War II. His grandaunt, Josefina Phodaca-Ambrosio, was the first Asian and only Filipino to become President of the Federacion Internacional de Abogadas.

Salvador III graduated Valedictorian from Union Elementary School, Philippine Christian University in 1979 and was the Editor-in-Chief of Winglettes. Presently, the Tranquil S. Salvador III Academic Excellence Award is given to the top graduate of the school. He is the first alumni president of Union Elementary School  In high school, he graduated in 1983 from San Beda University where he received Second Honors in his first two years and silver medal for Excellence in Scientific Research in his final year.

As a thriving young leader, he was elected as Student Council President of the College of Arts and Letters, University of Santo Tomas, where he earned his degree in economics in 1987. Before his admission to the Philippine Bar in 1992, he served as legal intern in the Commission on Human Rights, Associate Editor of the Ateneo Law Journal, and Student Council President of the Ateneo De Manila University, School of Law (Ateneo), where he received his Juris Doctor in 1991. Based on legal education in the Philippines, Ateneo conferred in 1991 the first Juris Doctor degree in the Philippines. He also served as the first chairman of the Association of Law Students of the Philippines for National Capital Region in 1990. In recognition, Ateneo awarded him the Evelio B. Javier Leadership Award, an award for students who have consistently pursued the "ideals of genuine leadership, concern for fellow students and selfless service to the law school and the community." (Villanueva, 2008)

Salvador III obtained his Master of Laws in Suffolk Law School where he specialized in global business law. Visiting International Scholar on Trial Advocacy at Suffolk University Law School in September 2018. Honorary Degree, Doctor of Philosophy in International Humanitarian Law, National Academy of Security and Defense Planning, Romania..

His siblings are Assistant Solicitor General (ASG) Alexander S. Salvador and Dr. Jonathan S. Salvador.

Academic career 

Salvador III has been in the academe for 29 years, and has been appointed to various teaching and professional positions. In 2006, he was appointed as the Dean of the Pamantasan ng Lungsod ng Pasay. Presently, the Dean of the newly established Manila Adventist College-School of Law and Jurisprudence (MAC-SLJ) which was designated as a Bar Testing Center for the 2020/2021 Bar Examinations by the Supreme Court. The afternoon examination on February 4, 2022 started 10 minutes before 2pm and ended at 5:50 pm before sunset out of respect to the religious activities of the Adventist who observe Sabbath beginning at sunset Friday to sunset Saturday. Dean Salvador of MAC-SLJ suggested the "10 minutes solution" which the Supreme Court treated as the "best negotiated solution" in Bar Bulletin No. 36, S. 2022.  

He is a professor of law in the University of the Philippines,  the Ateneo De Manila University, where he serves as the vice-chairman of the Remedial Law Department, Pamantasan ng Lungsod ng Maynila, and Centro Escolar University School of Law and Jurisprudence. He was a professor of law in Far Eastern University, San Sebastian College and University of the East. He specializes in remedial law, civil and criminal procedure, evidence, trial technique and provisional remedies.

He was the holder of the Justice Jose Colayco Professorial Chair in Remedial Law from 2010 to 2016, and the Tan Yan Kee Professorial Chair from 2006 to 2009, both awarded by Ateneo. He has the ability to simplify, correlate and integrate procedural laws in a manner that students easily understand. Some of them claim to hear his lectures as they answer the bar examinations which they fondly refer to as "Tranquilism".

Salvador III is part of the UP Law Center Committee that deliberated and suggested answers to the Philippine Bar Remedial Law questions in 2007–2010, 2011, 2013, and 2015. In 2011, he became part of the Oversight Committee, led by Justice Roberto Abad, that validated the first multiple choice bar questions. He also gives lectures to several bar review centers in the Philippines.

Salvador III is a member of the Committee that drafted the Quezon City Litigation Practice, an initiative of the Philippine Supreme Court, with the assistance of the American Bar Association Rule of Law and the United States Agency for International Development. He was appointed by Justice Roberto Abad in the technical working group for Pre-Trial and Trial for the amendment of the Rules of Civil Procedure.

Member of the Committee on the Revision of the Rules of Court by the Supreme Court, Memorandum Order No. 03-2019  and Member of the Sub-Committee for the Revision of the 1997 Rules of Civil Procedure. and Rules on Evidence 

Bar Examiner in Remedial Law for the 2018 Bar Examinations . The Chairman of the 2018 Bar Examinations, Justice Mariano C. Del Castillo, said "I chose Atty. Salvador from many other qualified seasoned litigators and professors of law, to be the 2018 Bar Examiner in Remedial Law ... [for] his known impartiality and ability to craft questions that will determine a bar candidate's fitness to become a member of the Philippine Bar. He of course, did not disappoint me, the legal community and the law academe. His name will forever be etched in the history of the bar examinations as one of those who not only gave fair questions, but also delivered fair results" (Foreword, Criminal Procedure). 

Author of Criminal Procedure which was published and released by Rex Publication. In the foreword of Chief Justice Lucas P. Bersamin, he said that "[W]ith his long experience in law practice, and his unstinting interest in the subject, the work is scholarly, to say the least. His exhaustive treatment could only come from a specialist in procedural law like him".

Awards and Citations 
Awardee in Law by the Huwarang Pilipino (Exemplary Filipino) Foundation in 2001 and 2005 

Awardee of the Organized Response for the Advancement of Society Inc. (ORAS) in 2011 which was founded by Former Supreme Court Justice Emilio Gancayco to promote time consciousness and honesty in service.

Special Alumni Recognition from the Ateneo de Manila Law Alumni Association, Inc. in 2017 for his service as Dean of Pamantasan ng Lungsod ng Pasay.

Anak TV Awardee, 2016-2018

Listed as Change Agent in the Suffolk University Law School, Alumni Magazine, Spring 2019. 

Listed in The Philippines' top 100 lawyers   and listed in IFLR1000 as Leading Lawyer in Project Development and Mining(2014) , and Highly Regarded in Energy and infrastructure, Project Development and Mining (2017-2022). 

Distinguished Alumnus in Private Law Practice (2022), Ateneo Law Alumni Association, Inc. (ALAAI)

Legal career 

Salvador III was the spokesperson and member of the Defense Team in the Impeachment Case of the late Chief Justice Renato Corona in 2012. Other members of the Defense Team were its lead counsel former Associate Justice Serafin Cuevas, and prominent lawyers Eduardo delos Angeles, Jose Roy III, Jacinto Jimenez, Dennis Manalo, Ramon Esguerra, and Karen Jimeno former Undersecretary of the DPWH.

He gained substantial media attention for sharing his legal opinions and sentiments that the trial should not be a contest of popularity. He was also asked by then-Senate President Juan Ponce Enrile who voted against Corona, to "take the podium and show his handsome face."

When asked about his experience "[A]s a spokesperson, what I did was not to put salt on an issue, not to sidestep an issue. And not to twist facts," he clarified."What I did was to try to explain the facts in relation to the law and let the people discern." 

In the recent impeachment case against de facto Chief Justice Maria Lourdes Sereno, Salvador III was again eyed to assist the House of Representative prosecutors for the possible impeachment proceedings in the Philippine Senate. However, Sereno was ousted through the Quo-Warranto Petition, filed by Solicitor General Jose Calida. Salvador III was one of the legal analysts who concurred that the quo-warranto ouster was constitutional and valid.

Media reporters have consulted with Salvador III on his views regarding the looming constitutional crisis predicated on the Impeachment Complaint filed against the seven Supreme Court Justices who voted against Sereno.

He has also served as the spokesperson and a lawyer for the PhP. 2 Billion tax assessment case filed against Senator Emmanuel "Manny" Pacquiao The Supreme Court issued a preliminary injunction enjoining the Resolution of the Court of Tax Appeals requiring Pacquiao to post a bond worth billions to restrain the collection of the deficiency taxes against him (Spouses Pacquiao v. CTA and CIR, G.R. No. 213394, April 6, 2016).

He was the lead counsel of Deputy Speaker (former Governor of Cebu) Gwendolyn Garcia in the various graft and administrative cases filed against her. The Sandiganbayan acquitted Governor Gwendolyn Garcia in the case involving the Cebu provincial government's purchase of 98.8 million property due to lack of sufficient evidence 

Salvador III, in his private law practice, is a Partner in the Romulo, Mabanta, Buenaventura, Sayoc, and Delos Angeles Law Firm, where he is the Co-Head of the Litigation & Arbitration, and Environment & Natural Resources Departments.

He successfully represented the minority shareholders in the case of Jonathan Dee v. Harvest All Investment Limited, et al., G.R. No. 224834, March 15, 2017, where the Supreme Court declared that an action calling for Stockholders' Meeting is incapable of pecuniary estimation, and the pronouncement in the case of Lu v. Lu Ym, 658 Phil.156 (2011) that an intra-corporate controversy always involves a property in litigation and that there can be no case of intra-corporate controversy where the value of the subject matter cannot be estimated is but an obiter dictum.

Media Advocacy 
Salvador III merges his hats as a law educator and media practitioner in mainstreaming and popularizing law education into public consciousness, highlighting the practical relevance of the usually construed—ivory tower— discipline to the daily life of the Filipino.

He is the mainstay television host of Patakaran on Net 25 a public affairs program that aims to "dispel the fiction that law is difficult to understand by imparting a basic knowledge to its viewers." He is also the radio host of Legally Yours on Radyo Aguila (DZEC 1062), where he gives free legal consultation and advice on relationships, family matters, and current events in the Philippines.

Civic life 

Salvador III is the former President of the Integrated Bar of the Philippines - Quezon City Chapter (2009–2011) where he launched the first and only Integrated Bar of the Philippines (IBP) on Wheels Program that brought legal aid assistance by van to local communities. From 2010 to 2011, he served as the District Governor of Rotary International for District 3810, the oldest District in the Philippines consisting the cities of Manila and Pasay and provinces of Cavite and Oriental Mindoro. He likewise sits on the boards of various corporations and non-government organizations in the Philippines.

Personal life 
Salvador III is married to Maria Roselle Apasan with four children, Tranquil Matthew IV, Maria Isabela, and twins Jose Miguel and Jose Gabriel who were models of one of the promotional campaign of Ateneo to encourage people to walk instead of using cars inside its campus.

He is a family man, having been reported once by the media to have skipped certain schedules of the Corona Impeachment to attend the graduation of his son Tranquil Matthew IV at the Ateneo Grade School.

References 

20th-century Filipino lawyers
Academic staff of the University of the Philippines
Academic staff of Ateneo de Manila University
1967 births
Living people
University of Santo Tomas alumni
Ateneo de Manila University alumni
Philippine Christian University alumni
San Beda University alumni
Legal educators
Deans of law schools in the Philippines
Filipino academic administrators
Legal scholars
Filipino columnists
Academic staff of Pamantasan ng Lungsod ng Maynila
Academic staff of Far Eastern University
Academic staff of Centro Escolar University